UMF Stokkseyri is an Icelandic association football club. It is located in a village called Stokkseyri in the southern part of Iceland. The club currently plays in 4. deild (5th level on pyramid).

History

Ungmennafélag Stokkseyrar (e. Stokkseyri's Youth Club), simply known as Stokkseyri, was established in 1908 as a general sports club and is one of the oldest sports clubs in Iceland.

Stats history 
{|class="wikitable"
|-bgcolor="#efefef"
! Season
! League
! Pos.
! Pl.
! W
! D
! L
! GS
! GA
! P
!Cup
!Notes
|-
|2013
|4. deild (Group A)
|align=right |8
|align=right|14||align=right|1||align=right|0||align=right|13
|align=right|10||align=right|57||align=right|3
|1st round
|
|}

References

External links
Official home page: umfstokkseyrar.is/
Official Facebook page: www.facebook.com/MeistaraflokkurStokkseyrar?fref=ts

Football clubs in Iceland